Everyday People is a 2004 studio album by contemporary Christian music artist Nicole C. Mullen. Produced by Mullen, her husband David Mullen, Tommy Sims, James "Big Jim" Wright, Andrew Ramsey and Shannon Sanders, it was released on September 14, 2004 on Curb Records. It peaked at No. 41 on the Billboard Heatseakers chart on October 9, 2004 and No. 6 on their Top Gospel Albums chart on October 2, 2004.

Track listing

Personnel 
Adapted from AllMusic

 Nicole C. Mullen – vocals, background vocals, programming
 David Mullen – horn arrangements, string arrangements, background vocals
 Daniel O'Lannerghty – upright bass, string arrangements, strings
 Bootsy Collins – bass, engineer, guitar, keyboards, programming, background vocals
 Jimmy Wright – keyboards
 Ivy Bostic – group member, background vocals
 Kenneth Cooke – group member, guitar, background vocals
 Tommy Sims – bass, claves, Clavinet, guitar, background vocals
 James "Big Jim" Wright – keyboards
 Andrew Ramsey – bass, bass vocals, guitar, programming
 Bernie Harris – bass
 Shannon Sanders – Fender Rhodes, Hammond organ, programming, toy piano
 DeMarco Johnson – keyboards
 Morris Mingo – keyboards
 Cary Barlowe – guitar
 Tom Hemby – guitar
 Akil Thompson – bass, percussion
 Iz – drum programming
 Jamie Moore – drum programming, drums
 Chris Estes – drums
 Dan Needham – drums
 Marvin Sims – drums
 Jasmine Mullen – readings
 LeAnne Palmore – background vocals
 Antonio Phelon – background vocals
 Debreca Smith – background vocals
 Jerard Woods – background vocals
 Jovaun Woods – background vocals
 Jason Eskridge – vocals, background vocals
 Max Fulwider – saxophone
 Calvin Turner – trombone
 Steve Patrick – trombone, trumpet
 David Angel – strings
 Monisa Phillips Angel – strings
 Janet Askey – strings
 David Davidson – strings
 Jim Grosjean – strings
 Robert Mason – strings
 Carole Rabinowitz-Neuen – strings
 Pamela Sixfin – strings
 Alan Umstead – strings
 Karen Winkelmann – strings

Production

 Nicole C. Mullen – producer, executive producer
 David Mullen – producer
 Tommy Sims – producer, engineer, mixing
 James "Big Jim" Wright – producer
 Shannon Sanders – producer
 Andrew Ramsey – producer, engineer
 Kenneth Cooke – engineer
 Danny Duncan – engineer
 Greg Fuqua – engineer
 Marius Perron III – engineer
 Aaron Swihart – engineer
 Drew Douthit – assistant engineer, digital editing
 Lee Bridges – assistant engineer
 Craig Bauer – digital editing, engineer
 Bryan Lenox – engineer, mixing
 Matt Marrin – engineer, mixing
 John Frye – mixing
 F. Reid Shippen – mixing
 Ken Love – mastering
 Shawn McSpadden – A&R
 Katherine Petillo – creative director
 Ray Roper – design
 Robert Ascroft – photography
 Alexia Abegg – wardrobe
 Jennifer Kemp – wardrobe
 Valerie Bridgeforth – hair stylist

References 

2004 albums
Nicole C. Mullen albums